Although most United States-made television series are directly exported to the United Kingdom using the original production and cast, some successful shows have been remade for the British market.

The following list include American TV shows and concepts remade for a British audience.

See also 
 List of American television series based on British television series

References 

United States television series remade for the British market, List of
List
British market, List of United States television series remade for the
British market, List of United States television series remade for the
United States television series remade for the British market, List of
 
B